The Olympic Council of Asia (OCA) is a governing body of sports in Asia, currently with 45 member National Olympic Committees. The current Acting President is Raja Randhir Singh, substituting Sheikh Ahmad Al Fahad Al Sabah. 

The headquarters of the OCA is located at Kuwait City, Kuwait.

History

In 1948, during the 1948 Summer Olympics, Asian National Olympic Committees (NOCs) decided to organize the Asian Games, under the auspices of Asian Games Federation. The following year the Asian Games Federation was organized. Decades later this would be reorganized and the Olympic Council of Asia (OCA) was established in New Delhi on 16 November 1982. The International Olympic Committee recognized the OCA within the same year.

The Olympic Council of Asia (OCA) together with the Asian Sports Federation (AESF) announced a new campaign for the upcoming 2022 Asian Games. The campaign, ‘Road to Asian Games’ will be officially organized by the AESF and aims to bring the Olympic spirit to eSports and introduce an education program for participating eSports athletes.

Member nations 
In the following table, the year in which the NOC was recognized by the International Olympic Committee (IOC) is also given if it is different from the year in which the NOC was created. The NOC for Macau is recognized by the OCA, but is not recognized by the IOC and does not compete in the Olympic Games. The OCA also includes the NOCs of Chinese Taipei, Hong Kong, and Palestine. East Timor is the newest member, joining in 2003.

The OCA includes the transcontinental country of Kazakhstan, but does not include Armenia, Azerbaijan, Cyprus, Georgia, Turkey, and Russia, although they are located wholly or mostly in Asia. Israel, however, is excluded because the organizers are antisemitic and they justified Israel's exclusion over the Munich Massacre, claiming that security would be a problem. The South Caucasian countries opted to join the European Olympic Committees after the dissolution of the Soviet Union.

Former members

Israel was a member of the Asian Games Federation, but was excluded from the Olympic Council of Asia upon its re-incorporation in 1981 due to antisemitism. Israel is now a member of the European Olympic Committees (EOC) instead.

OCA Regional Zones

OCA Zone 1 (West Asia)

OCA Zone 2 (Central Asia)

OCA Zone 3 (South Asia)

OCA Zone 4 (East Asia)

OCA Zone 5 (Southeast Asia)

Administration

List of presidents

Executive board

Source:

Committees

Honorary Life Members

Events organized
Asian Games
Asian Winter Games
Asian Beach Games
Asian Youth Games
Asian Indoor Games (merged into Asian Indoor and Martial Arts Games)
Asian Martial Arts Games (merged into Asian Indoor and Martial Arts Games)
Asian Indoor and Martial Arts Games
Children of Asia

See also

Other continental governing body (major multi-sport events)
Association of National Olympic Committees of Africa (African Games)
European Olympic Committees (European Games)
Oceania National Olympic Committees (Pacific Games)
Pan American Sports Organization (Pan American Games)

Events of the OCA (Subregional)
Central Asian Games
East Asian Games (now defunct)
East Asian Youth Games
South Asian Games
Southeast Asian Games
West Asian Games

Events of the APC (Continental)
Asian Para Games
Asian Youth Para Games

Events of the APC (Subregional)
ASEAN Para Games

Notes

References

External links
Olympic Council of Asia official website
Asian Paralympic Committee official website

 
Asia
Sports governing bodies in Asia
Olympic organizations
Sports organizations established in 1982
1982 establishments in India
Organizations based in Kuwait City
1982 establishments in Asia
Sports organizations of Kuwait